Marinospirillum is a bacteria genus from the family of Oceanospirillaceae.''

References

Oceanospirillales
Bacteria genera